Jason Trusnik (born June 6, 1984) is a former American football linebacker and special teamer. He was signed by the New York Jets as an undrafted free agent in 2007. He played college football at Ohio Northern.

College career
Trusnik played college football at Ohio Northern. He was twice named a Division III All-American and twice named All-Ohio Athletic Conference. Additionally, he played in the Texas vs. The Nation Game for 'The Nation' team and was named a co-captain for Team United States in the Aztec Bowl.

Professional career

New York Jets

Jason Trusnik was signed as an undrafted free agent in 2007 by the New York Jets.  As a rookie, he appeared in six games and recorded six tackles on special teams after spending the first nine weeks on their practice squad.  He made his NFL debut in a game against the Pittsburgh Steelers on November 18.  Trusnik was placed on injured reserve on December 26.

In 2008, Trusnik played in seven games and was inactive for two.  He also had spent the first seven games of the season on the Physically Unable to Perform list.  Trusnik made five tackles and a fumble recovery on defense as well as 11 tackles on special teams.

In 2009, Trusnik played in the first four games of the season with the Jets.  He was named AFC Special Teams Player of the Week after his game against Tennessee on September 27, where he had two tackles, a forced fumble, and fumble recovery.  Trusnik was then traded to the Cleveland Browns.

Cleveland Browns

On October 7, 2009, Trusnik was traded to the Cleveland Browns by the New York Jets in exchange for wide receiver Braylon Edwards.  
  He played the remainder of the 2009 season with the Browns, where he started 10 games and played in 12.  During this time, Trusnik registered 54 tackles, 2.5 sacks, and one pass defensed.  His first start of his NFL career came on October 18 in a game at Pittsburgh.  Trusnik made a career-high 10 tackles on November 29 in Cincinnati.  The Browns finished the season with the best kickoff return average starting position (31.4) in the NFL with Trusnik as a blocker.

In 2010, Trusnik played in all 16 games for the Browns, starting five.  He registered 15 tackles, one sack, and one pass defensed. He played mostly on special teams where he had nine tackles.

Miami Dolphins
On July 27, 2011, the Miami Dolphins signed Trusnik to a 2-year deal.  He was with the Dolphins for four seasons, starting 10 games and playing in 48.

In 2014, Trusnik caught his first career interception from a Tom Brady pass on December 14.  He also scored his first touchdown off of a fumble recovery against the Jets on December 28.

Carolina Panthers
On March 31, 2015, the Carolina Panthers signed Trusnik to a 1-year deal as an unrestricted free agent. On September 5, 2015, he was released by the Panthers.

Minnesota Vikings
On November 10, 2015, the Minnesota Vikings signed Trusnik.  He had previously worked with Vikings defensive coordinator, George Edwards, while he was the linebackers coach at Miami from 2012 to 2013.

New Orleans Saints
On December 14, 2016, Trusnik was signed by the New Orleans Saints.

Retirement
On April 10, 2018, Trusnik announced his retirement from the National Football League.

References

External links
Minnesota Vikings bio

1984 births
Living people
People from Summit County, Ohio
Players of American football from Ohio
American football linebackers
Ohio Northern Polar Bears football players
New York Jets players
Cleveland Browns players
Miami Dolphins players
Carolina Panthers players
Minnesota Vikings players
New Orleans Saints players